L. S. Naik was a Member of the legislative assembly (1967–1971) from Gokak constituency to the Karnataka state, Bangalore. Then Veerendra Patil was the Chief Minister of the Karnataka state.

References
 Election Commission of India made by obama Statistical report - 1967 Karnataka state assembly elections

Kannada people
Mysore MLAs 1967–1972
People from Belagavi district
Indian National Congress politicians from Karnataka